Sånger från 63° N (Songs from 63° N) is the name of the third album by the Swedish folk band Triakel. It was released on 23 June 2004 on Amigo Records. The songs are mostly traditional Swedish folk songs from the province of Jämtland, though some are recent compositions. The text of I Jamtlann (Jämtland) is in a Jämtland dialect. The rest of the songs are in Swedish.

Reception

AllMusic noted the "chemistry between the [band's] members" and wrote that singer Emma Härdelin was best when presenting tragic songs. Also the reviewer for Helsingborgs Dagblad wrote that Triakel benefitted from the cooperation between the instrumental musicians and Härdelin's vocal performance.

Track listing

Personnel 
 Emma Härdelin - vocals
 Kjell-Erik Eriksson - fiddle
 Janne Strömstedt - harmonium
 Anders Larsson - guest vocals on Min docka
 Triakel - song arrangements
 Gustav Hylén - producer
 Lennart Jonasson - photographer
 Pelle Rumert - cover design
 Syre Reklambyrå - cover design

References

2004 albums
Triakel albums